Jerry's Diary is a 1949 one-reel animated cartoon that is the 45th Tom and Jerry short released by Metro-Goldwyn-Mayer, directed by William Hanna and Joseph Barbera, produced by Fred Quimby, scored by Scott Bradley, and animated by Kenneth Muse and Ed Barge. It is the first of several compilation Tom and Jerry shorts, integrating footage from previous shorts into the plot.

Summary
Tom places a bunch of traps in front of Jerry's mouse hole. He raises a cleaver over the hole but is immediately stopped by a talking radio. The announcer, Uncle Dudley, tells him it is "Be Kind To Animals" week. Tom removes the traps he just set up and returns with flowers, a present, and a pie with, "To Jerry with Love" on it. Tom knocks on the wall but Jerry is not there. Tom removes the grate on the wall and sees that Jerry is not at home. But he does see his diary. Tom reaches in, grabs it, and starts to read it.

The first entry dates on Sunday, April 5, when Tom used Jerry as a Tee when he played golf. This segues into two scenes from 1945's Tee for Two. In the first scene Tom uses Jerry as a tee, then puts Jerry through the ball cleaner. Tom is laughing while reminiscing this scene. He continues to read the next part of the entry, where he hits the ball and grins, only for it to bounce off a tree and smash his teeth. Because of this entry, Tom's mood immediately goes down and he turns to another entry.

The next entry dates on Thursday, May 12, when Jerry got curious about Tom and it almost got him caught. This changes to a scene from 1944's Mouse Trouble, where Tom attempts to catch Jerry by raising the mouse's curiosity. Tom succeeds and catches him, but Jerry pulls the same trick on him with his fists. Tom inspects them only to get punched in the eye. Tom gets angry from what he has read and throws away the flowers in irritation.

He turns to another entry which dates on Monday, June 3, when Jerry got Tom into two nasty surprises in a chase. The scene changes to 1946's Solid Serenade, where both of them bring their chase from outdoors into the kitchen. The chase ends with a window falling on Tom's neck causing him to shriek in pain. Tom is now enraged at what Jerry has written about him and he destroys Jerry's present (which appears to be a box of chocolates) in frustration.

He is just about to throw the diary away when he opens it again and reads one more entry dating Saturday, July 4, when Tom and Jerry fought using firecrackers. The scene changes to 1943's The Yankee Doodle Mouse, where Tom throws dynamite towards Jerry, but Jerry immediately throws it back; the mouse uses reverse psychology to make Tom grab the dynamite for himself, which explodes. Tom then traps Jerry inside a kettle and throws in a stick of dynamite. The mouse escapes as no explosion occurs. The puzzled cat opens the kettle's lid, after which the firecracker goes off, leaving him resembling a blackface sunflower.

Tom has finally had it and furiously rips Jerry's diary to pieces in exasperation just as soon as the mouse comes home. He is happy to see that Tom has baked him a pie. Jerry points at the pie and then points to himself, asking if the pie is for him. Tom is just about to strangle Jerry when Uncle Dudley, via the radio, stops him once again. "And now before your old Uncle Dudley says goodbye, did you get a nice little surprise for your little animal friend?" Tom picks up the pie with a devilish smile. The radio says, "You did? Well, let him have it."  And Tom does - by throwing the pie at the mouse. Jerry, who looks rather dazed, looks into the camera and shrugs his shoulders.

Availability
DVD
Tom and Jerry's Greatest Chases, Vol. 1
Tom and Jerry Spotlight Collection Vol. 3, Disc One

Voice cast
Joseph Forte as "Uncle Dudley"
William Hanna as "Tom Cat"

References

External links

Jerry's Diary at the TCM Movie Database

1949 animated films
1949 films
Tom and Jerry short films
Short films directed by Joseph Barbera
Short films directed by William Hanna
1940s American animated films
1949 comedy films
Compilation films
Films scored by Scott Bradley
Metro-Goldwyn-Mayer animated short films
American comedy short films
Films produced by Fred Quimby
Diaries
Metro-Goldwyn-Mayer cartoon studio short films
1940s English-language films